The Jasna Góra Monastery (Luminous Mount) in Częstochowa, Poland, is a shrine dedicated to the Virgin Mary and one of the country's places of pilgrimage. The image of the Black Madonna of Częstochowa, also known as Our Lady of Częstochowa, to which miraculous powers are attributed, is one of Jasna Góra's most precious treasures. 

The site is one of Poland's official national Historic Monuments (Pomnik historii) and is tracked by the National Heritage Board of Poland.

History

Jasna Góra Monastery was founded in 1382 by Pauline monks who came from Hungary at the invitation of Władysław, Duke of Opole. The monastery has been a pilgrimage destination for hundreds of years, and it contains an important icon of the Virgin Mary. The icon, depicting the Mother of God with the Christ Child, is known as the Black Madonna of Częstochowa or Our Lady of Częstochowa, which is widely venerated and credited with many miracles. Among these, it is credited with miraculously saving the Jasna Góra monastery during the Siege of Jasna Góra that took place at the time of The Deluge, a 17th-century Swedish invasion. The event stimulated the Polish resistance. The Poles could not immediately change the course of the war, but, after an alliance with the Crimean Khanate, they repulsed the Swedes. Shortly thereafter, in the cathedral of Lwów (Lviv), on April 1, 1656, Jan Kazimierz, the King of Poland, solemnly pronounced his vow to consecrate the country to the protection of the Mother of God and proclaimed Her the Patron and Queen of the lands in his kingdom.

Among the monastery's most important exhibits is the medal from the 1983 Nobel Peace Prize received by Lech Wałęsa, the former Polish president and trade-union organizer.

Walking pilgrimages
Every year since the Middle Ages, thousands of Poles go in pilgrim groups to visit Jasna Góra. In 2011, it was estimated that 3.2 million pilgrims from 80 countries around the world went to the shrine. Around 830,000 pilgrims took part in 228 pilgrimages organized in different places across Poland, 143, 983 of which reached the monastery on foot.

Monastic etiquette
There are typically numerous pilgrims and tourists at Jasna Góra Monastery, and the volume of excited voices can be high. However, upon entering the Monastery, it is expected etiquette for visitors to be silent or as quiet as possible out of respect. Often, there is a long line of people who wait to approach the shrine of the Black Madonna of Częstochowa. Upon arriving at the place of the shrine at which one would pass in front of the icon of Our Lady, it is expected and a sign of respect for pilgrims to drop to their knees, and traverse the anterior of the shrine on their knees.

Gallery

See also
 Shrines to the Virgin Mary
 Black Madonna of Częstochowa
 National Shrine of Our Lady of Częstochowa

References

Bibliography

Notes

External links

 Jasna Góra website
 Jasna Góra and the Shrine of Our Lady of Częstochowa

Buildings and structures in Częstochowa
Christian monasteries in Poland
Shrines to the Virgin Mary
Black Madonna of Częstochowa
Basilica churches in Poland
Pauline monasteries
Churches in Silesian Voivodeship